Phoezon or Phoizon was a locality of ancient Arcadia, in the territory of Mantineia. It was situated near the road from Mantineia to Tegea, close to the forest of Pelagos. The tomb of Areithous was located here.

References

Populated places in ancient Arcadia
Former populated places in Greece
Lost ancient cities and towns